is a Japanese manga series written and illustrated by Yu Imai. It has been serialized in Kodansha's seinen manga magazine Monthly Young Magazine since July 2018.

Publication
Written and illustrated by Yu Imai, The Witches of Adamas was serialized in Kodansha's seinen manga magazine  from July 20, 2018, to November 18, 2021, and was then transferred to the YanMaga Web website on December 20, 2021. Kodansha has collected its chapters into individual tankōbon volumes. The first volume was released on March 6, 2019. As of October 20, 2022, nine volumes have been released.

In North America, Seven Seas Entertainment licensed the manga for English release in both physical and digital format under its Ghost Ship adult imprint. The first volume was released on February 15, 2022.

Volume list

Reception
In a review of the first volume, Christopher Farris of Anime News Network commented that the series' focus on fanservice as a vehicle for comedy lets it "successfully deploy the kind of content that would only be a distraction in less dedicated works", adding however that due to the nature of its content, which "[o]ccasionally veers close to straight-up pornography before prioritizing for entertaining comedy again", the series "isn't going to be for everybody".

See also
Imori 201, another manga series by the same author

References

External links
  
 

Harem anime and manga
Kodansha manga
Masturbation in fiction
Seinen manga
Seven Seas Entertainment titles
Sex comedy anime and manga
Supernatural anime and manga